Michael Opoku Baah is a Ghanaian badminton player.

Early life and education 
Baah was born on 22 July 1996 and hails from Takoradi in the Western Region of Ghana. He is a student of University of Cape Coast.

Career 
In April 2019, Baah participated in the 2019 African Games qualifiers in Port Harcourt in Nigeria. He took part in the Mixed Double with his pair Perpetual Quaye where they beat Adjima Rolande and Amoussoli Vivien by (21-5/21-10).

Achievements 
In February 2018, Baah and his teammates Abraham Ayittey, Emmanuel Yaw Donkor and Daniel Sam won Bronze at the Thomas and Uber Teams Championships Preliminaries.

In July 2019, Baah and his pair Daniel Sam defeated Team Nigeria by 21–17, 22–24 and 21–19 to win Bronze in the Men's double during the 2019 J.E. Wilson International Badminton tournament.

Controversy 
In March 2022, Baah was suspended by the Badminton Association of Ghana due to an alleged misconduct and indiscipline at an international event when he was competing for Ghana.

References 

Ghanaian badminton players
1996 births
Living people
University of Cape Coast alumni